The Narcotic Drugs Import and Export Act was a 1922  act of the 67th United States Congress. Sponsored by Sen. Wesley L. Jones (R) of Washington and Rep. John F. Miller (R) of Washington. It is also often referred to as the Jones-Miller Act.

Federal Narcotics Control Board
The Act also led to the establishing of the Federal Narcotics Control Board (FNCB) to tightly oversee the import and export primarily of opiates, but also other psychoactive drugs like coca. The control board were created to better control what America was exporting from its territories to others as well as what was being brought in, to ban all recreational consumption and to control the quality of what was being used for medical purposes.

Background

The newly brought in act was but another in a long line from 1848 that set out to curtail the use of drugs for recreational purposes, most of which started from San Francisco area with the attempt to curtail opium smoking, first by banning the smoking in public, exempting opium dens, until finally going for an all out ban, nationwide in 1922. Before the Jones-Miller Act laws were passed on a state by state basis.

Opium Importation Prohibition of 1909
60th United States Congress passed House bill , better known as the Smoking Opium Exclusion Act of 1909, which U.S. President Theodore Roosevelt enacted into law on February 9, 1909. Public Law 60-221 was effective after the first day of April 1909 imposing an unlawful Act to import any derivative, any form, or preparation of opium into the United States. The statutory law authorizes the importation of the psychoactive drug provided any opium derivatives and preparations will be for medicinal purposes only.

Amendments to 1922 Act
U.S. Congressional amendments to the Narcotic Drugs Import and Export Act, and for other purposes.

See also
 Anti-Heroin Act of 1924
 Harrison Narcotics Tax Act
 Narcotic
 Narcotic Farms Act of 1929
 Uniform State Narcotic Drug Act

References

External links
 

1922 in law
1922 in the United States
67th United States Congress
Drug policy of the United States
History of drug control
United States federal controlled substances legislation